Fila Holdings Corp. is a South Korean sportswear brand with Italian roots. The company originally was founded by Ettore and Giansevero Fila in 1911 in Coggiola, near Biella, Italy. In 2003, it was sold to United States-based Sports Brand International. Fila Korea acquired the brand in 2007 and launched its initial public offering on the Korea Exchange in September 2010.

Fila Holdings owns golf equipment maker Acushnet Company. Fila Holdings' largest shareholders include Piemonte Co., Ltd at around 20%, Fila Holdings at 20%, and South Korea's National Pension Service at around 13%. Gene Yoon (Yoon Yoon-su), who owns a 75% stake in Piemonte, serves as the chairman of Fila Holdings. The chief executive officer is Yoon Keun-chang.

History 

In 1906, brothers Ettore and Giansevero Fila joined the Giuseppe Regis and Figli di Coggiola wool mill in Biella, Piedmont, Italy. In 1911, the Regis brothers withdrew from the company and the wool mill took the name Fratelli Fila S.p.A. Fila was officially established in 1923. It originally made clothing for the people of the Italian Alps, primarily underwear. In the 1970s it moved into sportswear, with an endorsement deal with tennis player Björn Borg, and the brand became more popular after the transition.

In 1988, Fila changed ownership from Italian chemical company SNIA S.p.A. to Fiat-controlled holding company Gemina, later restructured as Holding di Partecipazioni. In 1991, Fila shifted focus from clothing in Europe to footwear in the US, and completed a buyout of its US license. High-profile sponsorships, including basketball players Grant Hill and Jerry Stackhouse, helped make Fila America's fastest-growing footwear brand by 1995.

In 2003, Holding di Partecipazioni sold the company to Cerberus Capital Management, a US-based hedge fund, after the company over-committed itself to expensive athletic endorsements at a time when margins were under pressure. Cerberus owned Fila through holding company Sports Brands International, which owned and operated all Fila businesses around the world with the exception of Fila Korea, which was a separate company operating the brand under licence. In January 2007, the brand and all its international subsidiaries were acquired by Fila Korea.

In 2009, Anta Sports acquired the rights to the brand in China, Hong Kong, and Macao from then Fila company's Chinese joint venture partner Belle International. Fila Korea still owned 15% shares of the joint venture company "Full Prospect".

In September 2010, Fila Korea Ltd. launched its initial public offering on the Korea Exchange. In May 2011, it acquired global golf equipment maker Acushnet Company, becoming the new owner of golf brands such as Titleist and FootJoy, for $1.23 billion.

In March 2021, Fila China stated that it would continue to source cotton from Xinjiang despite public criticism that such cotton had been produced with forced Uyghur labor in the region.

Sponsorships

In October 2019, South Korean boy group BTS became the global brand ambassadors of Fila.

Baseball teams
  Doosan Bears

Tennis players 

  Diego Schwartzman
  Ashleigh Barty
  Alexei Popyrin
  Barbora Krejcikova
  Karolina Pliskova
  Tommy Haas
  Laura Siegemund
  Ekaterina Alexandrova
  Soonwoo Kwon
  John Isner
  Ann Li
  Robin Montgomery
  Brandon Nakashima
  Reilly Opelka
  Sam Querrey
  Shelby Rogers

References

External links

 

Italian companies established in 1911
1980s fashion
1990s fashion
2000s fashion
2010s fashion
2020s fashion
Athletic shoe brands
Clothing companies established in 1911
Shoe brands
Sportswear brands
2007 mergers and acquisitions
Clothing brands of South Korea